Patrick S. Shey (born January 22, 1959) is an American politician in the state of Iowa.

Shey was born in Algona, Iowa and attended the University of Iowa and DePaul University. A Republican, he served in the Iowa House of Representatives from 1999 to 2003 (52nd district), from Linn County, Iowa.

References

1959 births
Living people
People from Kossuth County, Iowa
University of Iowa alumni
Iowa lawyers
Republican Party members of the Iowa House of Representatives